Hu (胡) is a Chinese surname. In 2006, it was the 15th most common surname in China. In 2013, it was the 13th most common in China, with 13.7 million Chinese sharing this surname. In 2019, Hu was the fifteenth most common surname in Mainland China.

Some other, less common surnames pronounced Hu include 瓠, 護, 戶, 扈, 虎, 呼, 忽, 斛 and 壶. In Cantonese, “胡” is also pronounced as "Wu" or "Woo" or "Ow".

Meaning
In Classical Chinese, hú 胡 meant: "dewlap; wattle" and was a variant Chinese character for "how; why; what" (he 何), "long-lasting; far-reaching" (xia 遐), "part of a dagger-axe", hu- in "butterfly" (hudie 蝴蝶), or possibly "Northern Barbarians".

History 
According to tradition, the Hu (胡) surname has several historical origins. First, Hu could derive from the family of Duke Hu of Chen. King Wu of Zhou (r. 1046-043 BCE) enfeoffed his son-in-law Gui Man 媯滿 (supposedly a descendant of the legendary sage king Emperor Shun) with the state of Chen (in modern Henan Province). His posthumous name was Duke Hu, and some of his descendants adopted Hu as their surname. Second, Hu could derive from two Zhou vassal states named Hu 胡, one located near Luohe (Henan Province) or another near Fuyang (Anhui Province). Third, Hu could derive from non-Chinese people adopting it as their surname. For example, in the 496 Change of Xianbei names to Han names, Hegu/Gegu 紇骨 was changed to Hu 胡. Fourth, Hu could derive from the clan name of the ancient Tiele people within the Xiongnu confederation.

Non-Chinese peoples and ethnic minorities in China sometimes took the Chinese exonym for their ethnic group as their surname. The best example is Hu 胡, which was anciently used to refer to "barbarian" groups on the northern and western frontiers of China.

Hu (胡) was used for various northern and western peoples of non-Chinese stock. It was commonly used for people of Persian, Sogdian, Turkic, Xianbi, Indian and Kushan origin and, occasionally, for the Xiongnu (probably because of their connections with the Tonghu or Eastern Hu – a separate tribe conquered by the Xiongnu).

Two historically significant Hu names are this Donghu 東胡 (literally "Eastern Barbarians") "ancient Mongolian nomadic group" and the Wu Hu 五胡 ("Five Barbarians") "five nomadic tribes involved in the Wu Hu uprising" (304-316 CE) against the Jin dynasty. Hu (Foochow Romanized: Hù; POJ: Hô or Ô) was also one of the eight surnames of the first Han Chinese clans who first moved out the Central Plains into Fujian province (八姓入閩; Foochow Romanized: Báik Sáng Ĭk Mìng) during this conflict.

The Hồ 胡 clan which founded the Hồ dynasty in Vietnam originated in Zhejiang province of China.

The Hu family of Xidi are descended from Hu Shiliang, from Wuyuan, who was a descendant of Hu Changyi, a son of Emperor Zhaozong of Tang who was adopted by the Wuyuan Hu family.

The surname 虎 (Hǔ), which means "Tiger", is rare in China to the point where many people are not aware that it is used as a surname. Some believe it comes from the name of a 4,300-year-old chancellor, while others believe it originates among the Hui Muslim minority.

Notable people 

 Hu Angang, Tsinghua University professor
 Hu Bin, Chinese freestyle swimmer
 Aw Boon Haw 胡文虎, Burmese Chinese entrepreneur and philanthropist, founder of Tiger Balm
 Aw Boon Par 胡文豹, Burmese Chinese entrepreneur and philanthropist
 Hu Chen-pu, Minister of Veterans Affairs Commission of the ROC (2007–2008)
 Aw Cheng Chye, Singaporean millionaire and philanthropist
 Chih-Wei Hu, MLB pitcher
 Chin-lung Hu (born 1984), MLB player
 Hu Chuanzhi, CEO of the China State Shipbuilding Corporation
 Hu Chunhua 胡春华, member of the 18th and 19th Politburo of the Chinese Communist Party
 Hu Dahai, 14th century Hui Muslim general
 David Hu, American mathematician, roboticist, and biologist
 Hu Denghui 胡登辉, former Chinese international footballer
 Hu Die, actress, "Movie Queen" of the 1930s
 Evelyn Hu, Harvard University professor of applied physics and engineering
 Evelyn Hu-DeHart, Brown University professor of history and American studies
 Hu Feng 胡风, Chinese writer and theorist of arts and literature
 Hu Fo, Taiwanese political scientist and activist
 Frank Hu, Harvard University professor of medicine and public health
 Hu Ge 胡歌 (born 1982), actor
 Hu Haichang (born 1928), Chinese mechanical and aerospace engineer
 Hu Haiyan, Chinese academician and scientist
 Hu Hanmin, influential Kuomintang politician
 Hu Hesheng (born 1928), Chinese mathematician
 Jayley Woo and her twin sister Hayley Woo (born 27 December 1991), Singaporean actresses
 Jason Hu 胡志强, Republic of China politician
 Hu Jia 胡佳, pro-democracy activist in the People's Republic of China
 Jianying Hu, American engineer
 Hu Jimin (1919–1998), Chinese nuclear and plasma physicist and educator
 Hu Jintao 胡锦涛, former General Secretary of the Chinese Communist Party and the paramount leader of China
 Hu Jinqiu (born 1997), Chinese basketball player
 Julia Hu (born 1985), American entrepreneur
 Hu Jun (born 1968), Chinese actor
 Kelly Hu 胡凯丽 (born 1968), American actress
 Oh Laye Koh 胡立国, Singaporean bus driver and convicted killer
 Hu Lanqi 胡兰畦, one of the first women generals of the Republic of China and later Communist revolutionary
 Hu Lien 胡璉, Chinese Nationalist general
 Myolie Wu 胡杏兒, Hong Kong singer and actress
 Hu Nai-yuan, Taiwanese violinist
 Nan Hu, Chinese physician-scientist, molecular geneticist, and cancer epidemiologist
 Hu Ning (1916–1997), Chinese theoretical physicist and educator
 Hu Peizhao, Chinese economist and a professor at Xiamen University
 Hu Ping Chinese actress
 Hu Qiaomu 胡乔木, People's Republic of China politician
 Hu Qili 胡启立, member of the 13th Politburo Standing Committee of the Chinese Communist Party
 Richard Hu 胡赐道, former Finance Minister of Singapore
 S. Jack Hu, University of Georgia administrator and professor of engineering
 Hu Sheng, Chinese Marxist theorist and historian
 Hu Shih 胡适, Chinese writer and scholar
 Hu Songshan 虎嵩山, Chinese Hui Muslim Imam of the Yihewani sect
 Ting-Ting Hu (born 1979), English-born Taiwanese actress
 Hu Weide 胡惟德, politician and diplomat of the Qing dynasty and the Republic of China
 Hailan Hu, Chinese neuroscientist 
 Wei-Shau Hu, American geneticist
 Wei-Shou Hu, Taiwanese-American chemical engineer
 Wen-mei Hwu 胡文美, American computer engineer
 Yuen Pau Woo 胡元豹, Canadian senator and facilitator of the Independent Senators Group
 Hu Xiansu (1894–1968) Chinese botanist
 Gordon Ying Sheung Wu 胡應湘, chairman of the board of Hopewell Holdings Ltd.
 Hu Yaobang 胡耀邦, former Chairman and General Secretary of the Chinese Communist Party
 Hu Yepin 胡也频, Chinese writer, poet, and playwright, prominent Chinese socialist
 Yi Hu, American engineer
 Yinling Hu, Chinese molecular biologist
 Hu Yitian 胡一天, Chinese actor
 Yuenyong Opakul, Thai singer, musician, songwriter and entrepreneur
 Hu Zaobin 胡藻斌, early 20th-century Chinese painter, famous for painting tigers
 Hu Zongnan, Chinese general in the National Revolutionary Army
 Hu Zongxian 胡宗憲, Chinese general during the Ming dynasty 
 Hồ Chí Minh: 20th century Vietnam communist leader
 Hồ dynasty of Vietnam 胡朝:
Hồ Quý Ly 胡季犛
Hồ Hán Thương 胡漢蒼

See also 
Ho, variant of surname Hu
Oh or Ow, Fujian variant of surname Hu

References

External links
The Hu Peoples, Silk Road Seattle Virtual Art Exhibit.
Non-Chinese peoples and neighboring states: Hu 胡, ChinaKnowledge.
胡, Chinese Text Project
Surname HU (胡), Chinese Culture Forum

Chinese-language surnames
Chen (state)
Individual Chinese surnames